The seal of Tbilisi, Georgia, was designed in the late 1980s and reconfirmed as an official seal of the city on 8 June 2005. 

The design is a traditional Georgian shield where the Georgian Mkhedruli inscription თბილისი ("Tbilisi") with the capitalized letter თ form a stylized falcon and pheasant illustrating the legend of Tbilisi's origin. Along the upper edge are seven small seven-point stars lined up in crescent format. An intervening oak twig is symbolic of sturdiness and durability and creates a cross-like partition at the bottom of the shield which shelters the name of Tbilisi written in historic Georgian scripts – Asomtavruli and Nuskhuri. It rests upon a water wave symbolizing the Mtkvari River on which the city is situated.

References 
 

Government of Tbilisi
National symbols of Georgia (country)
Tbilisi
Tbilisi
Tbilisi
Tbilisi